Autoimmune polyendocrine syndromes (APSs), also called polyglandular autoimmune syndromes (PGASs) or polyendocrine autoimmune syndromes (PASs), are a heterogeneous group of rare diseases characterized by autoimmune activity against more than one endocrine organ, although non-endocrine organs can be affected. There are three types of APS, and there are a number of other diseases which involve endocrine autoimmunity.

Types
 Autoimmune polyendocrine syndrome type 1, an autosomal recessive syndrome due to mutation of the AIRE gene resulting in hypoparathyroidism, adrenal insufficiency, hypogonadism, vitiligo, candidiasis and others.
 Autoimmune polyendocrine syndrome type 2, an autosomal dominant syndrome due to multifactorial gene involvement resulting in adrenal insufficiency plus hypothyroidism and/or type 1 diabetes.
 Immunodysregulation polyendocrinopathy enteropathy X-linked syndrome (IPEX syndrome) is X-linked recessive due to mutation of the FOXP3 gene on the X chromosome. Most patients develop diabetes and diarrhea and many die due to autoimmune activity against many organs. Boys are affected, while girls are carriers and might experience mild disease.

Cause
Each "type" of this condition has a different genetic cause. IPEX syndrome is inherited in males by an X-linked recessive process. The FOXP3 gene, whose cytogenetic location is Xp11.23, is involved in the mechanism of the IPEX condition.

Diagnosis

Diagnosis for type 1 of this condition for example, sees that the following methods/tests are available:
 Endoscopic
 CT scan
 Histologic test

Differential diagnosis
For this condition, differential diagnosis sees that the following should be considered:
 CD25 deficiency
 STAT5B deficiency
 Severe combined immunodeficiency
 X linked thrombocytopenia

Management 

Immunosuppressive therapy may be used in type I of this condition. Ketoconazole can also be used for type I under certain conditions.

The component diseases are managed as usual; the challenge is to detect the possibility of any of the syndromes and to anticipate other manifestations. For example, in a person with known type 2 autoimmune polyendocrine syndrome but no features of Addison's disease, regular screening for antibodies against 21-hydroxylase may prompt early intervention and hydrocortisone replacement to prevent characteristic crises

See also
 Immunosuppression

References

Further reading

External links 
 
 PubMed

Endocrine diseases
Autoimmune diseases
Rare syndromes
Diseases of immune dysregulation